How U Feel may refer to:

 "How U Feel", a song by Snakehips
 "How U Feel", a song from Huncho Jack, Jack Huncho by Travis Scott and Quavo